Möckeln Airport , also known as Möckelns Flygfält, is an airport in Älmhult Municipality, Sweden, run by the Älmhults flygklubb. The club has about 25 members and owns a SOCATA M.S.894A Rallye Minerva.

See also
 List of airports in Sweden

References
 Älmhults Flygklubb 

Airports in Sweden